Hunting-Clan Air Transport was a wholly private, British independent airline that was founded in the immediate post-World War II period. It began trading on 1 January 1946 as Hunting Air Travel Ltd. It was a subsidiary of the Hunting Group of companies, which had come from the shipping industry and could trace its history back to the 19th century. The newly formed airline's first operating base was at Bovingdon Airport in Southeast England. Its main activities were contract, scheduled and non-scheduled domestic and international air services that were initially operated with Douglas Dakota and Vickers Viking piston airliners from the company's Bovingdon base. A change of name to Hunting Air Transport occurred in 1951. By that time, the airline had emerged as one of the healthiest and most securely financed independent airlines in Britain. In October 1953, the firm's name changed to Hunting-Clan Air Transport, as a result of an agreement between the Hunting Group and the Clan Line group of companies to invest £500,000 each in a new company named Hunting-Clan Air Holdings Ltd, the holding company for the combined group's air transport interests. Apart from Hunting-Clan Air Transport itself, this included Field Aircraft Services Ltd, the Hunting group's aircraft maintenance arm. In 1960, Hunting-Clan Air Transport merged with the Airwork group to form British United Airways (BUA).

History
Hunting Air Travel Ltd was established as a company at Luton Airport in December 1945 by three members of the Hunting family, including a former Royal Flying Corps pilot during World War I.

In addition to an airline operation and a maintenance organisation, the Hunting Group's other aviation interests included Percival Aircraft Ltd, Hunting Aerosurveys Ltd and Aerofilms Ltd.

Hunting-Clan's operations included all-economy Safari/colonial coach class services to East, Central, Southern and West Africa, as well as similar operations to Gibraltar, Africargo all-cargo services from Manchester and London to East Africa, general passenger and cargo charter and inclusive tour (IT) flights. Hunting-Clan African Airways was set up as an associated company to operate freight services from Salisbury to Kariba, Lusaka and Nairobi as well as IT flights to Kariba and Mozambique. Regular live- and bloodstock flights were another Hunting-Clan speciality. The airline also gained scheduled licences to operate a Northern network centred on Newcastle upon Tyne.

On 14 June 1952, Hunting Air Transport began operating quasi-scheduled low-fare services from the UK to East, Central, Southern and West Africa using Vikings. These services were part of a joint operation with Airwork, another wholly private British independent airline of that era. Flights initially operated on a fortnightly basis. International Air Transport Association (IATA) minimum fare rules did not apply to these services because the governments that owned most of IATA's member airlines had not empowered it to set and control domestic air fares, which included dependent overseas territories.

The joint Hunting—Airwork Safari/colonial coach service from London to Nairobi routed via Malta, Wadi Halfa, Khartoum, Juba and Entebbe. It utilised single-class 27-seat Vikings, which took three days to complete the journey. Although this compared unfavourably with British Overseas Airways Corporation (BOAC), whose regular scheduled services took only 24 hours, load factors averaged 93% during the first nine months of operation. Hunting-Clan and Airwork continued to achieve very high average load factors of 85–90% because their £98 single fare was £42 cheaper than the comparable BOAC fare. These load factors were much higher than BOAC's, as a result of which the independents doubled the flight frequency on their London-Nairobi Safari/colonial coach route to once-a-week. This service proved to be so popular that a second weekly frequency was eventually added, which was operated alternately by each airline.

In 1953, operations were to commence on Hunting's Northern network of short-haul domestic and international European scheduled services from Newcastle. However, IATA member airlines objected to Hunting's proposed Scandinavian fares, which delayed the inauguration. This resulted in Hunting-Clan becoming the first British independent airline to join IATA at the following traffic conference in Honolulu, where a resolution was passed permitting fares 10% below standard tourist fares.

In June 1953, Hunting and Airwork jointly launched a fortnightly Safari/colonial coach service between London and Salisbury, entailing one round trip per month by each company. Hunting's Vikings' flightdeck crew comprised two pilots and a radio officer on all short- to medium haul Safari/colonial coach routes. On all long-range services a flight engineer manned the flightdeck as well. All passenger flights also carried an air hostess in the passenger cabin.

When the Scottish Clan Line shipping company became a joint venture partner in the Hunting Group's air transport business in late 1953, this resulted in a split of the group. As a consequence, Hunting's aircraft manufacturing activities were not transferred to the new holding company that took control of the airline and its maintenance support. At that time, the Clan Line was one of two UK shipping lines controlled by the Cayzer shipping magnates. Sir Nicholas Cayzer, who headed the Cayzer family's shipping businesses, viewed his stake in one of Britain's leading contemporary independent airlines as a defensive move to ward off air transport's growing competitive threat to the shipping industry. During that period, Alan Lennox-Boyd, the contemporary Minister of Transport and Civil Aviation, signalled the Government's willingness to let Hunting-Clan shift its base to London Airport (now London Heathrow).

In spring 1954, Hunting-Clan finally inaugurated its Northern network of short-haul scheduled services from Newcastle following IATA's 1953 resolution permitting fares 10% lower than corresponding standard tourist fares. Its aeroplanes also featured in the 1954 film 'Mask of Dust'.

In June 1954, Hunting and Airwork launched a joint Safari/colonial coach service to West Africa linking London with Accra via Lisbon, Las Palmas, Bathurst and Freetown.

In 1955, Hunting-Clan became the first British independent airline to operate state-of-the-art Vickers Viscount turboprop planes, when it took delivery of three brand-new series 730 aircraft. These replaced Vikings on Safari/colonial coach and trooping flights to Africa, as well as on some of the airline's general passenger charter and IT flights. During that year, the airline also shifted all its operations from Bovingdon to its new base at London Airport.

In 1956, the Clan Line and the Union-Castle Line, the two shipping lines controlled by the Cayzers, joined with the King Line and Bullard King & Co to form British & Commonwealth Shipping. During that time, the War Office invited new tenders for trooping flight contracts to Europe and the Far East, as a consequence of the Government's growing dissatisfaction with the operational performance and high costs of the ageing Hermes fleet that was contracted from Airwork, Britavia and Skyways to operate most of these flights. The War Office specified exclusive use of state-of-the-art Bristol Britannia turboprops on the Far Eastern route as it had calculated that this would save the Government £1.75m each year compared with continuing use of the Hermes. The War Office offered the successful bidder the option of purchasing three new Britannias from the Government as part of a five-year contract or the alternative to lease these planes under a three-year contract. The contracts were to become effective from 1958. Hunting-Clan, which already had two Britannias on order, won against competition from Air Charter and Airwork.

By 1957, Hunting-Clan and Airwork converted their successful East, West and Southern African Safari/colonial coach flights into regular "third-class" scheduled services. However, the Government forced the independents to maintain additional stops that were no longer needed, as a result of replacing Vikings with technologically advanced Douglas DC-6s and Vickers Viscounts. It also required them to share all traffic with BOAC on a 30:70 basis. Despite these restrictions, the independents' services were fully booked five months ahead within a fortnight of their launch. When Britain's African colonies became independent, Safari/colonial coach was converted into a fully fledged scheduled service. To secure their traffic rights between the UK and the newly independent African nations, Hunting-Clan and Airwork began participating in revenue-sharing agreements with BOAC and the destination countries' flag carriers.

1957 was also the year Hunting-Clan discontinued its Northern network, resulting in the closure of its base at Newcastle Airport. Hunting-Clan's Newcastle operations and engineering facilities were taken over by BKS Air Transport, another contemporary British independent airline. This move resulted in concentrating all of Hunting's UK-based activities at its new London Airport base.

Hunting-Clan made substantial losses in 1958. Its successful bid to take over the UK—Singapore trooping contract from Airwork had been priced too low to leave any room for the aircraft's depreciation. Hunting was also facing unexpected problems meeting the War Office's contractual requirements. This necessitated subcontracting a significant part of its newly won business to Air Charter at a loss. As a result, the airline got into financial trouble as soon as the contract started. At that time, trooping accounted for the biggest share of Hunting's overall business. The company's poor financial performance accelerated the initiation of exploratory talks with the Airwork group about a potential alliance, including a full-scale merger of their air transport businesses. These talks also came against the background of Conservative Prime Minister Harold Macmillan's government's decision to break up the Ministry of Supply and to create a separate Ministry of Aviation under Duncan Sandys with the intention of rationalising Britain's disparate aircraft manufacturers and independent airlines into bigger, economically viable entities. These moves culminated in the Civil Aviation (Licensing) Act of 1960.

By March 1960, Hunting-Clan's and Airwork's shareholders had finalised the merger terms. This was followed by a public announcement of their airline subsidiaries' intention to amalgamate all commercial activities from June 1960, trading as British United Airways.

Fleet 
Hunting-Clan operated the following aircraft types:

Avro Nineteen
Avro 685 York
Bristol Britannia 317
de Havilland DH 89 Dragon Rapide
Douglas DC-3
Douglas DC-6A
Percival Proctor V
Vickers Viking 1/1A/1B
Vickers Viscount 700
Vickers Viscount 800

Fleet in 1958
In April 1958, the Hunting-Clan fleet comprised 15 aircraft.

Accidents and Incidents
There are three recorded accidents involving Hunting-Clan aircraft. Two of these were fatal.

 The first fatal accident occurred on 17 February 1952. It involved a Hunting Air Travel Vickers 614 Viking 1 (registration: G-AHPI) operating an international non-scheduled passenger flight between Nice Côte d'Azur Airport and Malta Luqa Airport. This was the worst fatal accident in the company's history. The commission investigating the accident established "imprudence on the part of the pilot", who did not maintain a sufficient safety altitude during his flight over Sicily, as the prime cause. This was of particular importance in view of the thundery formations that were present over the area. The pilot's ignorance of existing wind conditions the aircraft encountered en route, which led to a three-degree discrepancy between the actual and intended track, was cited as a contributory factor. The investigating commission furthermore found that D/F stations at Rome and Cagliari provided flight safeguarding services as and when required, and that other D/F stations at Milan and Venice voluntarily transmitted bearing information to ensure the aircraft and its occupants reached their destination safely.
 The second fatal accident occurred on 2 December 1958. It involved a Hunting-Clan Vickers Viscount 732 (registration: G-ANRR) on a test flight following a major overhaul. While flying at  10 minutes after takeoff from London Airport, the aircraft lost its starboard wing. This caused the aircraft to crash and catch fire, killing all six occupants. Accident investigators established the reverse operation of the elevator spring tab as the probable cause. Incorrect maintenance of the spring tab mechanism and failure to notice the tab's faulty operation as a result of negligence on the part of maintenance personnel, who were responsible for inspecting the aircraft before returning it to service, involved the pilot in command in involuntary manoeuvres that overstressed the aircraft. This in turn resulted in the aircraft's right wing breaking off.
 The non-fatal incident occurred on 8 May 1951. It involved a Hunting Air Travel Vickers 639 Viking 1 (registration: G-AHPD) operating an international scheduled passenger flight from Bordeaux Mérignac to RAF Bovingdon. Following an uneventful takeoff from Mérignac, the no. 1 engine suddenly began to lose power when the aircraft climbed through  and the pilot in command throttled down to initial climbing speed. The pilot then shut down the malfunctioning engine, feathered the propeller and applied full power to the no. 2 engine to compensate for the loss of engine no. 1. However, this was insufficient to maintain altitude and led to the flightdeck crew's decision to execute a gear-up landing. When the aircraft touched the ground, it slid for about  before coming to a halt. There were no fatalities among the 32 occupants (five crew and 27 passengers). Accident investigators established the probable cause as the disconnecting of the articulated control rod of the propeller governor due to the lack of a split pin on the governor spindle, and due to the nut of the ball joint of the control spindle having been unscrewed by force.

See also
 List of defunct airlines of the United Kingdom

Notes
Notes

Citations

References

 (various backdated issues relating to Hunting Air Travel, Hunting Air Transport and Hunting-Clan Air Transport, 1946–1960)

External links
 Hunting-Clan at the Aviation Safety Network Database
 Hunting Air Travel and Hunting Air Transport at the Aviation Safety Network Database
 contemporary timetable images
 Hunting-Clan Vickers 610 Viking 1B G-AIVC on the ramp at newcastle Woolsington on 18 June 1955. The aircraft had been on lease from Eagle Airways and therefore still retained that airline's basic colours.
 Hunting-Clan Douglas DC-6C G-APNP on the ramp at Salisbury (Harare) during 1959.
 Hunting-Clan African Airways Douglas DC-3 on the ramp at Salisbury (Harare) during 1959.
 Hunting-Clan Vickers Viscount 833 G-APTC on the ramp at Las Palmas Gando during April 1960.
 Hunting-Clan Bristol 175 Britannia 317 G-APNB on the ramp at Nairobi Embakasi during 1960. The aircraft was painted in the full livery of Hunting's parent company, the British & Commonwealth Shipping Co.

Defunct airlines of the United Kingdom
Airlines established in 1945
Airlines disestablished in 1960